Kinzua is a ghost town  or former town site in Wheeler County, Oregon, United States. It existed as a company town from 1927 to 1978. Kinzua lies directly east of Fossil and uses a Fossil mailing address.

The community was founded by Pennsylvania lumberman Edward D. Wetmore to support the sawmill operations of the Kinzua Pine Mills Company, that was named for the Kinzua Township in Pennsylvania. At one time Kinzua was the most populous community in Wheeler County and 330 people worked at the mill.

In 1929, the company built the Kinzua & Southern Railroad to ship forest products from the mill to Condon,  to the north. From Condon a Union Pacific feeder line went north to Arlington on the Columbia River. Through 1952, the Kinzua & Southern carried mail and passengers via a self-powered rail bus called "The Goose". The line closed entirely in 1976.

In 1965, Kinzua included 125 homes, a community hall, church, library, store, and the golf course. When the mill closed in 1978, the buildings were removed and the townsite was planted with trees, mainly ponderosa pine. The six-hole golf course of the Kinzua Hills Golf Club occupies part of the site. The nearby Kinzua landing strip and Kinzua Mountain retain the name as well.

See also
List of ghost towns in Oregon

References

External links

Historic image of Kinzua Pine Mills, 1939

1927 establishments in Oregon
Company towns in Oregon
Former populated places in Wheeler County, Oregon
Ghost towns in Oregon